Dominique Aulanier (13 September 1973 – 31 July 2020) was a French professional footballer who played as a midfielder.

Career
Born in Saint-Chamond, Aulanier played for Saint-Étienne, Nice, Nîmes, Cannes, Estoril, Sion, Sète, PCAC Sète and Béziers.

He died on 31 July 2020, aged 46.

References

External links
 

1973 births
2020 deaths
French footballers
AS Saint-Étienne players
OGC Nice players
Nîmes Olympique players
AS Cannes players
G.D. Estoril Praia players
FC Sion players
FC Sète 34 players
AS Béziers (2007) players
Ligue 1 players
Ligue 2 players
Championnat National players
Championnat National 2 players
Championnat National 3 players
Association football midfielders
French expatriate footballers
French expatriates in Portugal
Expatriate footballers in Portugal
French expatriate sportspeople in Switzerland
Expatriate footballers in Switzerland